Frank Crowe (30 October 1895 – 1951) was an English footballer who played as a wing half for Coventry City, Merthyr Town, Chesterfield and Rochdale.

References

Rochdale A.F.C. players
Coventry City F.C. players
Merthyr Town F.C. players
Chesterfield F.C. players
Tamworth F.C. players
Cannock Town F.C. players
English footballers
1895 births
1951 deaths
People from Dudley
Association footballers not categorized by position